Mehedi Maruf (born 4 April 1988) is a Bangladeshi first-class and List A cricketer. He is a right handed batsman. 
In October 2018, he was named in the squad for the Rangpur Riders team, following the draft for the 2018–19 Bangladesh Premier League.

References

External links
 
 

1988 births
Living people
Bangladeshi cricketers
People from Tangail District
Rangpur Riders cricketers
Fortune Barishal cricketers
Prime Bank Cricket Club cricketers
Abahani Limited cricketers
Barisal Division cricketers
Dhaka Division cricketers